Anolis jacare, the Jacare anole, is a species of lizard in the family Dactyloidae. The species is found in Venezuela and Colombia.

References

Anoles
Reptiles of Venezuela
Reptiles of Colombia
Reptiles described in 1903
Taxa named by George Albert Boulenger